Annette Benson (1895–1965) was a British film actress. She was a leading lady of British silent films of the 1920s, appearing in Confetti with Jack Buchanan and Downhill with Ivor Novello. She also featured in several French and German productions in the mid-1920s. Her career tailed-off with the arrival of sound film and she made her last screen appearance in 1931.

Perhaps her best-known role is that of the film star Mae Feather in Anthony Asquith's Shooting Stars.

Filmography

References

Bibliography
 Ryall, Tom. Anthony Asquith. Oxford University Press, 2013.

External links
 

1895 births
1965 deaths
Actresses from London
English stage actresses
English film actresses
English silent film actresses
20th-century English actresses
British emigrants to the United States